Lin Yutang (October 10, 1895 – March 26, 1976) was a Chinese inventor, linguist, novelist, philosopher, and translator. His informal but polished style in both Chinese and English made him one of the most influential writers of his generation, and his compilations and translations of classic Chinese texts into English were bestsellers in the West.

Youth
Lin was born in 1895 in the town of Banzai, Pinghe, Zhangzhou, Fujian.

His father was a Christian minister. His journey of faith from Christianity to Taoism and Buddhism, and back to Christianity in his later life was recorded in his book From Pagan to Christian (1959).

Academic career and Shanghai intellectual world
Lin studied for his bachelor's degree at Saint John's University in Shanghai, then received a half-scholarship to continue study for a doctoral degree at Harvard University. He later wrote that in the Widener Library he first found himself and first came alive, but he never saw a Harvard–Yale game. In financial difficulty, he left Harvard early and moved to work with the Chinese Labour Corps in France and eventually to Germany, where he completed his requirements for a doctoral degree in Chinese philology at the University of Leipzig. From 1923 to 1926, he taught English literature at Peking University.

Enthusiastic about the success of the Northern Expedition, he briefly served in the new Nationalist government, but soon turned to teaching and writing. He found himself in the wake of the New Culture Movement which criticized China's tradition as feudal and harmful. Instead of accepting this charge, however, Lin immersed himself in the Confucian texts and literary culture which his Christian upbringing and English language education had denied him.

His humor magazine The Analects Fortnightly (Lunyu Banyuekan, 1932–40, 1945–49) featured essays by prominent writers such as Hu Shih, Lao She, Lu Xun, and Zhou Zuoren and attracted a wide readership. He was a key figure in introducing the Western concept of humor, which he felt China had lacked. In 1924, Lin coined the term yōumò, phono-semantic match with the English word humor, and used the Analects to promote his conception of humor as the expression of a tolerant, cosmopolitan, understanding and civilized philosophy of life. In 1933, Lu Xun attacked the Analects for being apolitical and dismissed Lin's elegant xiǎopǐn wén, or "small essays", as "bric a brac for the bourgeoisie". Lu Xun nevertheless maintained a cordial relationship with Lin and continued to contribute to his journal.

Lin's writings in Chinese were critical of the Nationalist government to the point that he feared for his life. Many of his essays from this time were later collected in With Love and Irony (1940). In 1933, he met Pearl Buck in Shanghai, who introduced him and his writings to her publisher and future husband, Richard Walsh, head of John Day publishers, who published Lin's works for many years.

Lin's relation with Christianity changed over the years. His father was a second-generation Christian, but at Tsinghua, Lin asked himself what it meant to be a Christian in China. Being a Christian meant acceptance of Western science and progress, but Lin became angry that being a Christian also meant losing touch with China's culture and his own personal identity.

On his return from study abroad, Lin renewed his respect for his father, yet he plunged into study of Confucianism, Taoism, and Buddhism and did not identify himself as Christian until the late 1950s.

Career after leaving China, and death

After 1935, Lin lived mainly in the United States, where he became known as a "wise and witty" popularizer of Chinese philosophy and way of life. Lin's first best sellers were My Country and My People (1935) and The Importance of Living (1937), written in English in a charming style. Others include Between Tears and Laughter (1943), The Importance of Understanding (1960, a book of translated Chinese literary passages and short pieces), The Chinese Theory of Art (1967). The novels Moment in Peking (1939), A Leaf in the Storm (1940), and The Vermilion Gate (1953) were well received epics of China in turmoil while Chinatown Family (1948) presented the lives of Chinese Americans in New York. Partly to avoid controversial contemporary issues, Lin in 1947 published The Gay Genius: The Life and Times of Su Tungpo, which presented the struggle between Su Dongpo and Wang Anshi as parallel to the struggle between Chinese liberals and totalitarian communists.

Lin's political writings in English sold fewer copies than his cultural works and were more controversial. Between Tears and Laughter (1943) broke with the genial tone of his earlier English writings to criticize Western racism and imperialism.

After the attack on Pearl Harbor, Lin traveled in China and wrote favorably of the war effort and Chiang Kai-shek in Vigil of a Nation (1944). American China Hands such as Edgar Snow criticized the works.

Lin was interested in mechanics. Since Chinese is a character-based rather than an alphabet-based language, with many thousands of separate characters, it was difficult to employ modern printing technologies. Lin, however, worked on this problem for decades and came up with a workable Chinese typewriter, brought to market in the middle of the war with Japan.

The Mingkwai "Clear and Quick" Chinese-language typewriter played a pivotal role in the Cold War machine translation research. Lin also invented and patented several lesser inventions, such as a toothbrush that dispensed toothpaste.

From 1954-55, Lin served briefly and unhappily as president (or Chancellor) of the Nanyang University, which was newly established in Singapore by Chinese business interests to provide tertiary education in Chinese studies in parallel with the English-medium University of Singapore. However, according to CIA agent, Joseph B. Smith, Lin clashed with founder Tan Lark Sye and the board of trustees on the direction of the new university. Smith quoted Lin as complaining "They want to indoctrinate the students not only with a love of China ... but they also want to concentrate all teaching on a love of Mao Tse-tung." 

Further, the faculty resisted Lin's plans to demolish and rebuild the new school building (which though grand, was not "Western" enough), his demands to have sole control over finances, and a budget clearly beyond its means. Lin accepted a dismissal fee of $305,203, entirely contributed by Tan Lark Sye, to prevent depleting the university's funds.

After he returned to New York in the late 1950s, Lin renewed his interest in Christianity. His wife was a devout believer, and Lin admired her serenity and humility. After attending services with her at the Madison Avenue Presbyterian Church for several months, he joined the church and announced his return to the faith. His 1959 book From Pagan to Christian explained this move, which many of his readers found surprising.

With his facility for both Chinese and English idiom, Lin presided over the compilation of a Chinese-English dictionary, Lin Yutang's Chinese-English Dictionary of Modern Usage (1972), which contains a massive English index to definitions of Chinese terms. The work was undertaken at the newly founded Chinese University of Hong Kong.

His many works represent an attempt to bridge the cultural gap between the East and the West. He was nominated for the Nobel Prize in Literature in 1940 and 1950.

He continued his work until his death in 1976. Lin was buried at his home in Yangmingshan, Taipei, Taiwan. His home has been turned into a museum, which is operated by Taipei-based Soochow University. The town of Lin's birth, Banzai, has also preserved the original Lin home and turned it into a museum.

Lin's reputation and scholarship on Lin

Although his major books have remained in print, Lin was a thinker whose place in modern Chinese intellectual history has been overlooked until recently. Lin themed conventions have been organized in Taiwan and Lin's native Fujian, and in December 2011, the International Conference on the Cross-cultural Legacy of Lin Yutang in China and America was held at City University of Hong Kong, with professional and private scholars from mainland China, Hong Kong, Taiwan, Japan, Malaysia, the United States, Germany and Slovakia. The organizer of the conference was Dr. Qian Suoqiao, author of the book, Liberal Cosmopolitan: Lin Yutang and Middling Chinese Modernity (Leiden; Boston: Brill, 2010).

The first full-length academic study of Lin in English is Diran John Sohigian's "The Life and Times of Lin Yutang" (Columbia University Ph.D. diss., 1991). Jing Tsu's Sound and Script in Chinese Diaspora (Cambridge, MA: Harvard University Press, 2010) gives a detailed account of Lin Yutang's typewriter and its role in the context of late 19th century script reform, Chinese national language reform in the early twentieth century and the fascinating story of his typewriting keyboard and machine translation research during the Cold War.

Family
His wife, Liao Tsui-feng, was an author, who, along with her daughter Lin Hsiang Ju, wrote three cookery books which popularized Chinese cuisine in the English speaking world. Dr. Lin wrote introductions which explained the historical background and relevance for American life.

His first daughter Adet Lin Feng-ju (1923–1971) was a Chinese-American author who used the pseudonym Tan Yun.

His second daughter Lin Taiyi (1926–2003) was also known as Anor Lin in her earliest writing, and had the Chinese name Yu-ju. She was an author and the editor-in-chief of Chinese edition of the Reader's Digest from 1965 until her retirement in 1988. She also wrote a biography of her father in Chinese, which shows some signs of her father's literary flair.

His third daughter Lin Hsiang-ju (born 1931), was referred to as MeiMei in childhood. She was co-author of cookbooks with her mother, and was the head of the Department of Pathology, University of Hong Kong, Queen Mary Hospital Compound, in Hong Kong.

Works
Works by Lin Yutang free online at Internet Archive HERE

In Chinese 
Works by Lin in Chinese or published in China to 1935 include:

 (1928) Jian Fu Collection (Shanghai: Bei Hsin Book Company)
 (1930) Letters of a Chinese Amazon and War-Time Essays (Shanghai: Kaiming)
 (1930) Kaiming English Books (Three Volumes) (Shanghai: Kaiming)
 (1930) English Literature Reader (Two Volumes) (Shanghai: Kaiming)
 (1930) Kaiming English Grammar (Two Volumes) (Shanghai: Kaiming)
 (1931) Reading in Modern Journalistic Prose (Shanghai: Oriental Book)
 (1933) A Collection of Essays on Linguistics (Shanghai: Kaiming Book)
 (1934) Da Huang Ji (Shanghai: Living)
 (1934) My Words First Volume (Sing Su Ji) (Shanghai Times)
 (1935) Kaiming English Materials (Three Volumes) co-written by Lin Yutang and Lin you-ho (Shanghai: Oriental Book Co.)
 (1935) The Little Critic: Essays Satires and Sketches on China First Series: 1930-1932 (Shanghai: Oriental Book Co.)
 (1935) The Little Critic: Essays Satires and Sketches on China Second Series: 1933-1935 (Shanghai: Oriental Book Co.)
 (1935) Confucius Saw Nancy and Essays about Nothing (Shanghai: Oriental)
 (1936) My Words Second Volume (Pi Jing Ji) (Shanghai Times)
 (1966) Ping Xin Lun Gao e  (Taiwan: Wenxing Bookstore)
 (1974) A Collection of Wu Suo Bu Tan  (Taiwan: Kai Ming Book Company)

Works in English
Works by Lin in English include:
 (1935) My Country and My People, Reynal & Hitchcock, Inc., (A John Day Book)
 (1936) A History of the Press and Public Opinion in China, Kelly and Walsh
 (1937) The Importance of Living, Reynal & Hitchcock, Inc., (A John Day Book)
 (1939) The Wisdom of Confucius, Random House, The Modern Library
 (1939) Moment in Peking, The John Day Book Company
 (1940) With Love & Irony, A John Day Book Company
 (1941) A Leaf in the Storm, A John Day Book Company
 (1942) The Wisdom of China and India, Random House
 (1943) Between Tears & Laughter, A John Day Book Company, a plea for the West to change its plans for the post world war order, ((1945), published in London by Dorothy Crisp & Co Ltd.)
 (1944) The Vigil of a Nation, A John Day Book Company 
 (1947) The Gay Genius: The Life and Times of Su Tungpo, A John Day Book Company
 (1948) Chinatown Family, A John Day Book Company
 (1948) The Wisdom of Laotse, Random House
 (1948) Gay Genius: The Life and Times of Su Tungpo, William Heinemann Limited
 (1950) On the Wisdom of America, A John Day Book Company
 (1951) Widow, Nun and Courtesan: Three Novelettes From the Chinese Translated and Adapted by Lin Yutang, A John Day Book Company
 (1952) Famous Chinese Short Stories, retold by Lin Yutang, The John Day Book Company, reprinted 1952, Washington Square Press
 (1953) The Vermilion Gate, A John Day Book Company
 (1955) Looking Beyond, Prentice Hall (Published in England as The Unexpected Island, Heinemann)
 (1958) The Secret Name, Farrar, Straus and Cudahy
 (1959) The Chinese Way of Life, World Publishing Company
 (1959) From Pagan to Christian, World Publishing Company
 (1960) Imperial Peking: Seven Centuries of China, Crown Publishers
 (1960) The Importance of Understanding, World Publishing Company
 (1961) The Red Peony, World Publishing Company
 (1962) The Pleasures of a Nonconformist, World Publishing Company
 (1963) Juniper Loa, World Publishing Company
 (1964) The Flight of Innocents, Putnam's Publishing Company
 (1964) Lady Wu, Putnam's Publishing Company
 (1967) The Chinese Theory of Art, Putnam's Publishing Company
 (1972) Chinese-English Dictionary of Modern Usage, Chinese University of Hong Kong and McCraw
 (1928-1973) Red Chamber Dream

See also

Gwoyeu Romatzyh

References

Further reading
 Diran John Sohigian, "The Life and Times of Lin Yutang." Columbia University Ph.D. dissertation, 1991.
Jing Tsu, "Lin Yutang's Typewriter," in Sound and Script in Chinese Diaspora. Harvard University Press, 2010, pp. 49–79. 
 Suoqiao Qian. Liberal Cosmopolitan: Lin Yutang and Middling Chinese Modernity. Leiden: Brill, Ideas and History Series, 2011. 271p. .
 Suoqiao Qian. Lin Yutang and China's Search for Modern Rebirth. Palgrave Macmillan, 2017. 

 Jianming He, “Dialogue between Christianity and Taoism,” in Ruokanen, Miikka, and Paulos Zhanzhu Huang, eds. Christianity and Chinese Culture (Grand Rapids, MI: W.B. Eerdmans, 2010), pp. 138–143.

 Rain Yang Liu, “Lin Yutang: Astride the Cultures of East and West,” in Carol Hamrin and Stacey Bieler, eds, Salt and Light: More Lives of Faith That Shaped Modern China (Eugene, OR: Pickwick Publications, 2011), 158-175.

 Ebeling, Richard M. "Lin Yutang, a Classical Liberal Voice for a Free China," American Institute for Economic Research, March 9, 2021

External links

 
 List of Lin Yutang's publications
 Lin Yutang Biography & Photograph Collection
 Lin Yutang's Chinese-English Dictionary of Modern Usage
 Patent for Lin Yutang's Chinese typewriter
 The Lin Yutang House (Taipei)
 "History of a 'Scribal Machine'", The Harvard Gazette (April 2, 2009)

Portrait 
    Lin Yutang. A Portrait by Kong Kai Ming at Portrait Gallery of Chinese Writers (Hong Kong Baptist University Library).

1895 births
1976 deaths
20th-century Taiwanese writers
20th-century Chinese translators
Chinese Christians
Taiwanese people from Fujian
20th-century Chinese inventors
Chinese lexicographers
Chinese male novelists
Harvard University alumni
Leipzig University alumni
Academic staff of Peking University
People from Zhangzhou
Philosophers from Fujian
Republic of China novelists
Republic of China philosophers
Republic of China translators
Simple living advocates
St. John's University, Shanghai alumni
Taiwanese Christians
Taiwanese inventors
Taiwanese lexicographers
Taiwanese male novelists
Taiwanese people of Hoklo descent
Taiwanese philosophers
Taiwanese translators
Writers from Fujian
20th-century Chinese novelists
Chinese people of World War I
20th-century lexicographers